Breest is a municipality in the Mecklenburgische Seenplatte district, in Mecklenburg-Vorpommern, Germany. It comprises the villages Bittersberg, Breest and Klempenow.

Klempenow Castle from the 13th century is located in the municipality.

References

External links

Municipalities in Mecklenburg-Western Pomerania